Kathy Smith (born 1963) is an Australian independent animator, painter, new media artist, and Professor with the USC School of Cinematic Arts. Smith chaired the John C. Hench Division of Animation & Digital Arts from 2004 - 2009 & 2010 - 2014. 

Smith was born in Taree, New South Wales. She graduated from the Sydney College of the Arts in 1985. Shortly after graduation, she was awarded the Sydney Morning Herald Traveling Arts Scholarship for Painting, the Dyason Bequest Study Grant from Art Gallery of NSW, the Dr Denise Hickey Studio Residency at Cite Interantionale des Arts, Paris and the Desiderius Orban Youth Art Award from the Australia Council. This allowed her to work and study in Europe from 1987 - 1988. Her experimental animations have screened "internationally, including SIGGRAPH N-Space Art Gallery, Sundance Film Festival, New York Digital Salon, Hiroshima, Anima Mundi, Ottawa and GLAS International Animation Festivals. She has exhibited internationally at group and solo exhibitions such as Institute of Contemporary Art, London, Conservatorio di Santa Maria degli Angeli, Florence, Italy, and the Australian National Gallery, Canberra." Her body of work includes the award-winning animated film, Indefinable Moods (2001).

Selected works
2021: Dimensions- 2D/3D VR Immersive
2018: Slippages|Grace - 2D/3D Animation
2011: Slippages - Holographic Animation & Painting Installation
2009: Grace Hologrpahic Animated Portrait Installation
2004-09: ‘Hanging Rock’ ‘Corset’ & ‘Bushland’ 6 mins Panorama Animation loops for above installation 
2001: Indefinable Moods
1993: Living on the Comet
1987: Delirium (installation)
1985: Change of Place
1985: Ayers Rock Animation
1984: A Figure in Front of A Painting
1983: Designed Nightmare
1983: Power & Passion

Selected film screenings

Indefinable Moods
Sundance Film Festival Official Selection 2002
SIGGRAPH 2001 
Computer Graphics International 2001, Hong Kong
Rhode Island International Film Festival
Prix Leonardo, Italy
New York Expo of Short Film & Video, New York
Anima Mundi International Animation Festival Rio de Janeiro Brazil
Edinburgh International Film Festival, Scotland
Micromuseum of Mediaterra Festival, Greece
14th Foyle Film Festival, Northern Ireland
Mediarama 2001 Electronic Art & New Technologies Festival, Spain
Canberra International Short Film Festival, Australia
Ajjijic International Film Festival, Mexico
Ankara International Film Festival, Turkey
Banff Mountain Film Festival, Canada

Living on the Comet
California Institute of the Arts Los Angeles, USA
Anima Mundi International Animation Festival, Brazil
‘Animania’ International Retrospective of Animation, Italy
5th International Animation Festival, Japan
Cardiff International Film Festival, UK
New York International Expo of Short Film & Video
Animated Moments AFI Cinema Sydney, Australia

Selected awards
2020 Winner Best Animation Dreamers of Dreams Film Festival London UK Slippages|Grace
2019 Winner Best Animation 28th Independent Filmmakers Showcase Los Angeles, CA Slippages|Grace 
2018 Winner Near Nazareth Festival Israel Slippages|Grace Best Experimental 
2018 Bronze Remi Award Winner WorldFest Houston Slippages|Grace Best Experimental
2017 SCA Mentoring Award Graduate Student Council
2013 Mellon Award for Mentoring Graduate Students University of Southern California
2011 Impact Award for Education from Adobe Systems Inc.
2005 Phi Kappa Phi Faculty Recognition Award in the Creative Arts, USC, for ‘Indefinable Moods’
2002 Best Animated Short, USA Film Festival, ‘Indefinable Moods’
2002 Best Animated Film Convergence Art Festival
2001 First Place, Computer Graphics International
2001 Silver Award, Prix Leonardo Parma Italy, ‘Indefinable Moods’
2001 Rhode Island International Film Festival, ‘Indefinable Moods’
 2001 Jury Award, New York Expo of Short Film & Video, ‘Indefinable Moods’
1994 Bronze Award, ‘Living on the Comet’ at the Expo of Short Film & Video New York
 1994 Certificate of Merit ‘Living on the Comet’ Cork International Film Festival
1985 Sydney Morning Herald Traveling Arts Scholarship for painting.

References

Sources
Wiedemann, Julius (ed.) "Kathy Smith." Animation Now! Los Angeles: Taschen, 2004: 262-9.

External links
 Official website
Scanlines New Media Archive
 -  USC School of Cinematic Arts

Living people
USC School of Cinematic Arts faculty
Australian film directors
Australian women film directors
Australian academics
1963 births
Animation educators